This is a list of defunct airlines of Latvia.

See also
 List of airlines of Latvia
 List of airports in Latvia

References

Latvia
Airlines
Airlines, defunct